Erskine Link, once known as Bay Street, is situated in East Perth between Hay Street and Adelaide Terrace.

History
Originally Bay Street followed the same route and ran down to a small bay near The Causeway, at the eastern end of Perth.  The section of Bay Street between Hay Street and Waterloo Crescent at the Perth Cemetery would be renamed after Bishop Hale, while the section south of Hay Street would become part of the Metropolitan Transport Trust's Causeway Depot. When the depot was closed in the 2000s the area was subdivided and Erskine Link was created. Like the Mandurah suburb Erskine, it was named after Archibald Erskine of the 63rd Regiment, the original regiment of soldiers who came to the Swan River Colony. Erskine was given a grant of land in the Murray district and was appointed Justice of Peace for the region.

Intersections

References

Streets in East Perth, Western Australia